The Kama Sutra is an Indian text on sex and love.

Kama Sutra or Kamasutra may also refer to:

Books
Kamasutra (manga), a 1990 Japanese pornographic anime by Go Nagai

Film
Kama Sutra: A Tale of Love (1996 film)
Kamasutra 3D, 2013 Hindi/English movie by Rupesh Paul
Tales of The Kama Sutra: The Perfumed Garden (2000 film)
Tales of The Kama Sutra 2: Monsoon (2001 film)
Kama Sutra (TV series), a 2000 television series

Music
Kamasutra (musician) Yaziza Entertainment
Kama Sutra Records, a record label

Albums
Kamasutra: Vollendung Der Liebe
Kamasutra (NPG Orchestra album), an album by The NPG Orchestra, a pseudonym of Prince
Kamasutra (Adassa album), a 2005 album by American reggaeton singer-songwriter Adassa
Kamasutra (Alisha Chinai album), 1990

Songs
"Kamasutra", Buddy De Franco
"Kamasutra", song by Adassa from Kamasutra (Adassa album)
"Kamasutra", song by Alisha from Kamasutra (Alisha Chinai album)
"Kamasutra", song by  Ruff Endz Someone to Love You
”Kama Sutra”, song by Jason Derulo and Kid Ink from Talk Dirty (Jason Derulo album)

Other uses
 Kama Sutra (computer worm), a computer
KamaSutra (brand), a brand name of condoms manufactured in India by JK Ansell Ltd.
Kamasutra (chocolate), a Romanian chocolate

See also
Gamasutra